The Green Meadows Conference is an OHSAA athletic league located in northwest Ohio.  The eight member schools are all located in one of three counties:  Defiance County, Paulding County, or Williams County.

History
source:

The Green Meadows Conference was formed as an athletic conference in 1962.  The charter members of the conference were Ayersville, Fairview, Hicksville, Paulding, and  Jewell (now Tinora).

In 1966, Blue Creek, from Paulding County and now a part of the Wayne Trace School District, joined the conference. Then in 1967, Oakwood joined.

The conference stayed intact until 1972, when district consolidations in Paulding County caused some changes in the make-up of some member schools. Blue Creek became a part of the new Wayne Trace School District, along with Grover Hill and Payne.  Oakwood became a part of the Paulding Exempted School System.  Antwerp and Holgate also joined the league making the number of members eight: Antwerp, Ayersville, Hicksville, Holgate, Fairview, Paulding, Tinora, and Wayne Trace.

In 1974, Paulding left the GMC to join the Northwest Conference.  They were replaced by Edgerton.  Membership remained the same until the 2019-20 school year.

In February 2020, it was announced that Holgate would join the Buckeye Border Conference as a member for every sport except football, which will participate in the Northern 8 Football Conference.  Holgate announced in late 2019 that they would move to 8-man football due to low numbers, which caused the remaining schools in the Green Meadows Conference to vote them out of the GMC over scheduling concerns.  The Tigers joined the BBC in the fall of 2021.

With Holgate's departure, the GMC decided to extend an invitation to former member Paulding in February 2020, which was accepted shortly afterwards.  Paulding, which had been a member of the Northwest Conference ever since leaving the GMC in 1974, rejoined during the 2021-2022 school year.

Members

Former members

Membership Timeline

Conference rivalries
 Tinora vs Fairview
 Ayersville vs Tinora
 Antwerp vs Wayne Trace
 Holgate vs Ayersville
 Hicksville vs Edgerton
Hicksville vs. Fairview
Hicksville vs. Tinora
Wayne Trace vs. Tinora
Antwerp vs. Hicksville

State championships

Fall sports

Winter sports

Spring sports

Notable athletes
Bruce Berenyi, Fairview (Major League Baseball Pitcher)
Chad Reineke, Ayersville (Major League Baseball Pitcher)
Denny Stark, Edgerton (Major League Baseball Pitcher)

See also
 Ohio High School Athletic Conferences

References

External links
 

Ohio high school sports conferences